James Charles Norman (1 September 1928 – 26 July 2017) was an Australian rules who played with Geelong in the VFL during the early 1950s. 

Norman was a premiership player in his final two seasons of league football. 

He was appointed coach of Golden Point in 1956.

He died in Horsham 26 July 2017.

References

External links

1928 births
2017 deaths
Australian rules footballers from Victoria (Australia)
Geelong Football Club players
Geelong Football Club Premiership players
Horsham Football Club players
Golden Point Football Club coaches
Two-time VFL/AFL Premiership players